St. Mary the Virgin is the local Church of England parish church for Brampton Ash, Northamptonshire. Sitting in the Diocese of Peterborough, the ironstone church boasts fine carvings of lions.

It is well lit at night, and can be seen across the Welland Valley for miles around.

The church is largely 13th and 14th century with some restoration in the 19th century.

Memorials

On the south wall of the chancel, Charles Norwich, died 1605, and wife, 2 kneeling figures under arch.

On the north wall of the chancel, Thomas Farmer, died 1764, and 2 other tablets.

On the west wall of the south aisle: George Bosworth, died 1804; marble tablet with 2 weeping willows bending over an urn. 2 19th century tablets alongside.

List of rectors

Thomas, 1230
John, ?
Richard de Flammevill, 1264
Hugh de Valle, 1294
John de Cumpton, 1319
John de Stamford, 1325
John de Felmersham, 1343
John de Kirkham, 1345
Oliver de Dineley, 1347
William de Gayrstang, 1348
John de Totyngton, 1349
Robert Wylmot, 1350
Henry de Greynesby, 1352
John Noioun, 1352
John Essex, 1356
William de Cabernaco, 1357
William Robert, 1358
Peter la Sudria, 1358
John Wade, 1366
John Millicent, 1375
John Rodyngton, 1379
Thomas Ilneston, 1382
John Wade, 1386
Walter Tyngyn, ?
John Bottlesnam, 1395
William Topclyff, 1396
William Hole, 1403
William Fraunceys, ?
William Islip, 1410
William Maidwell, 1412
John Fynche, 1420
William Halle, 1424
William Newbery, 1429
Thomas Webster, 1440
William Dene, 1441
Thomas Smyth, 1443
John Mallory, 1443
John Smyth, 1446
John Mallory, 1451
Richard Hyndeman, 1452
John Jonys, 1459
Richard Spicer, 1463
Walter Oudeby, 1466
John Bigcrofte, 1483
David Barker, 1503
John Devyas, 1509
Edmund Olyver, 1546
Anthony Palmer, 1573
Andrew Broughton, 1577
William Addison, 1615
Richard Cumberland, 1662
Samuel Blackwell, 1691
Robert Browne, 1720
Philip Bliss, 1733
Thomas Farrer, 1734
William Arden, 1764
Samuel Rogers, 1769
Samuel Heyrick, 1790
Hon. Charles Dundas, 1841
Sidney Lidderdale Smith, 1844
Austin Ainsworth Slack, 1904
Thomas Beckenn Avening Saunders, 1908
Gerard Cokayne Vecqueray, 1910

In 1928, the benefice was united with Dingley, and the incumbent ceased to be resident at Brampton Ash.

References

Church of England church buildings in Northamptonshire
Grade I listed churches in Northamptonshire